Close to a World Below is the fourth album by Immolation. It was released via Metal Blade Records in 2000.

Reception

Critical reception 
Since its release, Close to a World Below has received universal acclaim. Todd Nief of AllMusic gave the Close to a World Below four and a half stars, calling the album a late-career classic. He stated that with Close to a World Below, Immolation released one of the most profound and creative death metal albums of the 2000s which gave a new voice to a genre deluged with cookie-cutter clones. Metal Storm gave Close to a World Below a near-perfect 9.7 out of 10 praising Ross Dolan's vocals along with the overall brutality of the album.

Track listing

Personnel 
Immolation
 Ross Dolan – bass guitar, vocals
 Robert Vigna – guitar
 Thomas Wilkinson – guitar
 Alex Hernandez – drums

Production
 Paul Orofino – production, engineering, mastering
 Immolation – production

Visual art
 Jeff Wolfe – photography
 Andreas & Alex Marschall – cover art

References

External links 
 
 Close to a World Below at Metal Blade Records

2000 albums
Immolation (band) albums
Metal Blade Records albums